Brush Valley may refer to:

Brush Valley Township, Indiana County, Pennsylvania
Brush Valley, Pennsylvania, an unincorporated community
Brush Valley (Pennsylvania), a valley